Hyppönen is a Finnish-language surname that may refer to:

 Janne Hyppönen (born 1970), Finnish football manager and footballer
 Laura Hyppönen, Finnish filmmaker
 Mikko Hyppönen (born 1969), Finnish computer security expert and columnist

Finnish-language surnames